Eastgate is an unincorporated community located within Churchill County, Nevada, United States. It is located on Nevada State Route 722, which was formerly known as the Lincoln Highway.  Other alternate unofficial names include East Gate, Eastgate Station, and Gibralter Gate.

Eastgate was once a station on the Central Overland Route.  In 1859, Captain James Simpson named Eastgate for the shape of the hills which form a pass.

References

External links

 Rediscovered Lincoln Highway Gas Station In Nevada. American Road.

Unincorporated communities in Nevada
Unincorporated communities in Churchill County, Nevada